Vanessa Incontrada (born 24 November 1978) is a Spanish-Italian actress and model. She has appeared in more than 25 films and television shows since 2003. She starred in the film Il cuore altrove, which was entered into the 2003 Cannes Film Festival.

Early life and career 
Born to an Italian father, Filippo Incontrada (Roman from Garbatella of Neapolitan origins), and Spanish mother, precisely Catalan, Alicia Soler Noguera, she grew up between Barcelona and Follonica, and is a Spanish native speaker; she has a younger sister named Alice. She began her modeling career at the age of 17.

Filmography

References

External links

1978 births
Living people
Italian female models
Italian film actresses
Spanish female models
Spanish film actresses
Italian people of Spanish descent
Italian people of Catalan descent
Actresses from Barcelona
20th-century Italian actresses
21st-century Italian actresses